Samir Yousef Ghanem (15 January 1937 – 20 May 2021) was an Egyptian comedian, singer, and entertainer.

Early life and education
Ghanem was born in al-ʿAtawlah, Asyut Governorate. After graduating from high school, he joined the Police Academy following the example of his father, who was a police officer, but he was dismissed from it after failing two consecutive years, so he transferred papers to the College of Agriculture at Alexandria University and joined the acting teams there. He earned a bachelor's degree in Agriculture from Alexandria University. During the period of his studies in the police academy, Samir Ghanem narrates that he lived through the period of the presence of the famous actor Salah Zulfikar, who was a professor at the academy at the time. Ghanem stated that Zulfikar was a captain and was just promoted to the rank of major, and that Zulfikar was his idol and he had a great deal of respect for him.

Career
He was a member of the stand-up comedy trio Tholathy Adwa'a El Masrah alongside George Sidhom and El Deif Ahmed. Their debut was Doctor Save Me, a short performance that introduced them to the entertainment world. They presented the first ever TV show Ramadan Riddles. After El Deif Ahmed's death in 1970,  Ghanem and Sidhom continued under the same name (Tholathy Adwa'a El Masrah) until the 1980s. Together they made achievements such as; Al-Mutazawwigun in 1978 among others.

Samir Ghanem hosted a show on OTV called An Hour With Samir Ghanem.

Personal life
He was married to actress Dalal Abdel Aziz, and the father of actresses Donia and Amy.

Ghanem, who was recovering at a hospital from serious conditions after contracting COVID-19, died from complications of kidney functions and associated mucormycosis related to the infection at El Safa Hospital in Mohandiseen, Giza on 20 May 2021, at the age of 84.

His wife, Dalal Abdel Aziz, died on 7 August 2021, also from COVID-19 complications.

Selected filmography
Ghanem participated in more than 300 acting roles including films, TV series and theater plays, the last of which was in the series Badal Al Hadduta Talata with his daughter Donia Samir Ghanem.

Plays by Tholathy Adwa'a El Masrah after 1970
After El Deif Ahmed's death in 1970, Tholathy Adwa'a El Masrah continued producing plays. The two most famous are:
Moseeqa Fel Hay El Sharey (Music in East District)
Fondo’ El Talaat Wara’at (Three Cards Hotel)
Al-Mutazawwigun (Married)

Later plays
While George Sidhom retired due to a brain stroke, Samir Ghanem continued producing plays.
Goha Rules the City
Faris wa Bani Khayban (The Knight and Disaster Clan)
Akhuya Hayes wana Layes (Happy Is My Brother, Lost Am I)
Ana wal-Nizam wa Hawak (Me, the Government and Your Love)
Bahloul fi Istanbul (Bahloul in Istanbul)
Ana wa Mirati wa Monica (Me, My Wife and Monica)
Akhoia hayes wana layes
Mamno3 fe lelet el do5la
Habash house (beit el habash)

Films
 Khally Balak Min ZouZou
Fi Saif Lazim Nohib
El Mothneboon
 Easabat Al'nisa

References

1937 births
2021 deaths
People from Asyut
Egyptian comedians
Egyptian male film actors
Egyptian male television actors
Egyptian television presenters
Egyptian male stage actors
Deaths from the COVID-19 pandemic in Egypt
Deaths from mucormycosis
Egyptian Arabic
Alexandria University alumni